Beaver Creek is a  long 2nd order tributary to the Fisher River in Surry County, North Carolina.

Course
Beaver Creek rises about 1 mile northwest of Black Water, North Carolina.  Beaver Creek then flows southwest to join the Fisher River about 2 miles south-southwest of Turkey Ford, North Carolina.

Watershed
Beaver Creek drains  of area, receives about 48.2 in/year of precipitation, has a wetness index of 342.00, and is about 52% forested.

See also
List of rivers of North Carolina

References

Rivers of North Carolina
Rivers of Surry County, North Carolina